Balya is a town and district of Balıkesir Province in the Marmara region of Turkey. The mayor is Orhan Gaga (CHP).

References

Populated places in Balıkesir Province
Districts of Balıkesir Province